Harzfeld's was a Kansas City, Missouri-based department store chain specializing in women's and children's high-end apparel.

History
The company was founded in 1891, as "Parisian Cloak Company" by Siegmund Harzfeld and partner Ferdinand Siegel. Harzfeld served as president until succeeded by Ferdinand Siegel's son, Lester Siegel, Sr.  In February 1966, Lester Siegel, Jr. began serving as the company's third president

In 1959, Harzfeld's went public, with its common shares traded on the local over-the-counter stock exchange.  In 1972, the chain was acquired for $3 million by the retail conglomerate Garfinckel, Brooks Brothers, Miller & Rhoads, Inc. With the 1981, acquisition of its parent conglomerate, it became a part of Allied Stores.  In 1984, the chain was closed.

Flagship store
The original location of the Parisian Cloak Company was at 1108 and 1110 Main Street, Kansas City, Missouri. In 1913, the store moved to Main Street and Petticoat Lane and its name was changed to Harzfeld's. The new flagship was designed by noted architect John McKecknie as an office building. The store eventually expanded into an adjoining building, thereby extending its reach from Main to Walnut Streets.  After closing in 1984, the flagship was integrated into the Town Pavilion complex.

The store was renowned for a 1947 mural commissioned by the store and painted by Thomas Hart Benton.  After the store closure, the mural, known as "Achelous and Hercules", was acquired by the Smithsonian Institution's American Art Museum in Washington, D.C.

Branch stores
In 1929, Harzfeld's opened its first branch location in Columbia, Missouri.  The store catered to the local college student population of the University of Missouri, Stephens College, and Columbia College.  On April 10, 1954, Harzfeld's opened its first branch in Kansas City at Country Club Plaza.  In 1958, a second branch was opened in the Blue Ridge Mall shopping center. Further expansion occurred in 1963 with the opening of the Corinth Square store. A fifth store in greater Kansas City was opened in the Metcalf South shopping center in 1967. Shortly after its parent conglomerate acquired two Gus Meyer locations in Oklahoma in 1974, it converted them to Harzfeld's.

References

External links 
Harzfeld's website, by Joe & Michele Boeckholt (retrieved Sep 13, 2008).

Defunct department stores based in Missouri
Clothing retailers of the United States
Retail companies established in 1891
Retail companies disestablished in 1984
Companies based in Kansas City, Missouri
Defunct companies based in Missouri